Lindsay Robertson (born 28 June 1958) is a former British marathon runner.

In 1984, 1985 and 1987 he won the Tiberias Marathon and in 1987 the Frankfurt Marathon with his personal best of 2:13:30 h.

Achievements
All results regarding marathon, unless stated otherwise

References
 Lindsay Robertson at the Power of 10

1958 births
Living people
Scottish male marathon runners
Scottish male long-distance runners
Frankfurt Marathon male winners